Kadapiku is a village in Kadrina Parish, Lääne-Viru County, in northeastern Estonia. It lies on the right bank of the Loobu River, just north of Kadrina, the administrative centre of the municipality.

References

Villages in Lääne-Viru County